The Church of St Aeddan, Bettws Newydd, Monmouthshire, Wales, is a fifteenth-century church of twelfth-century origin. It contains a notable rood screen. The church is a Grade I listed building and remains an active parish church in the Heart of Monmouthshire Ministry Area.

History and architecture
The church dates from the twelfth century but the current building is medieval. The interior contains "perhaps the most complete rood arrangement remaining in any church in England and Wales". The rood screen, loft and tympanum are all in situ.  The Royal Commission on the Ancient and Historical Monuments of Wales considers that the screen is "most remarkable" and "probably unique in the British Isles". The church is a Grade I listed building.

St Aeddan's remains an active parish church in the Heart of Monmouthshire Ministry.

Gallery

Notes

References
 

Grade I listed churches in Monmouthshire
Church in Wales church buildings
15th-century church buildings in Wales